Joel Elizabeth Brough (born February 9, 1968) is a Canadian field hockey player. She has competed in numerous international competitions. Some of the highlights include: 1989 Junior World Cup,'90 &'94 Hockey World Cup, 1989 Champions Trophy, Field hockey at the 1992 Summer Olympics and 1995 Pan American Games. She was introduced to the sport in high school where she played on numerous OFSAA winning teams. From there, Brough competed for both York University and UofT, as well as, the province of Ontario. Brough is the Head of Health and Physical Education at The Sterling Hall School in Toronto and was also a Vancouver 2010 Olympic Torchbearer. In addition, Brough was inducted into the York University "Sports Hall of Fame" in 2012.

International competitions 
1989 – Champions Trophy,  (6th)
1989 – Junior World Cup, Ottawa (7th)
1990 – World Cup, Sydney (10th)
1991 – Pan Am Games, Havana (Silver Medal)
1991 – Olympic Qualifier, Auckland (3rd)
1992 – Olympic Games, Barcelona (7th)
1993 – World Cup Qualifier, Philadelphia (3rd)
1994 – World Cup, Dublin (10th)

References

External links
 
 
 

1968 births
Living people
Canadian female field hockey players
Olympic field hockey players of Canada
Field hockey players at the 1992 Summer Olympics
Pan American Games medalists in field hockey
Pan American Games silver medalists for Canada
Field hockey players at the 1991 Pan American Games
Field hockey people from Ontario
Medalists at the 1991 Pan American Games